The arsonium cation is a positively charged polyatomic ion with the chemical formula . An arsonium salt is a salt containing either the arsonium cation, such as arsonium bromide and arsonium iodide, which can be synthesized by reacting arsine with hydrogen bromide or hydrogen iodide. Or more commonly, as organic derivative such as the quaternary arsonium salts  (CAS: , hydrate form) and the zwitterionic compound arsenobetaine.

References 

Arsenic(−III) compounds
Cations